Jacobabad ( and ; formerly Khanger or Khangarh) is a city in Sindh, Pakistan, serving as both the capital city of Jacobabad District and the administrative center of Jacobabad Taluka, an administrative subdivision of the district. The city itself is subdivided into eight Union Councils. Sitting far to the northwest of the province, near the provincial boundaries of Sindh and Balochistan, Jacobabad became a city on the site of an existing village (Khangarh), and is crossed by the Pakistan Railways and many main roads of the province. It is the 43rd most populous city in Pakistan.

Jacobabad has been cited as one of the world's most vulnerable places to global warming, and one where the difference between 1.5°C and 2°C can be the difference between life and death.

Etymology 
The city is named after Brigadier-General John Jacob CB (1812–1858), an officer of the British East India Company who ruled this region during the last decade of his life. He is also known for the cavalry regiment called 36th Jacob's Horse. Jacobs was a graduate of Addiscombe Military Seminary. He was commissioned into the Bombay Artillery (Bombay Army) on his 16th birthday, and subsequently sailed for India in January 1828, never to set foot in England again. According to travel writer Salman Rashid, it was local residents "who took to calling the new settlement ‘Jekumbad’", later renamed to Jacobabad by the British rulers. The scale of progress and prosperity Jacob's works brought to the region can be appreciated by comparing those regions' relative prosperity at the time, compared to areas which were not under his administrative jurisdiction.

History

In 1847 Jacob was placed in political charge of the frontier and established his headquarters at the village of Khangurh (or Khanger). He started building infrastructure for the town around the village. Being an architect and an engineer himself, he designed and then executed the plans of laying a wide road network around the town that measured a good 600 miles (965 km). In that he resolved the problem of unavailability of potable water for the residents by excavating a tank that contained water brought from Indus through a canal. His biggest and most important feat was the excavation of Begaree Canal, originating from Guddu barrage on river Indus, going round the district irrigating thousands of acres of land previously uncultivated, thereby providing means of living to thousands of people. 

After the British Raj, the city was ruled by a Sardar, Taj Dero Khan Odho. 

In November 2010, then Prime Minister Yousaf Raza Gillani announced that University of Information Technology would be established in Jacobabad.

Climate
Jacobabad has a hot desert climate (Köppen climate classification BWh) with extremely hot summers and mild winters. Rainfall is low and mainly occurs in the monsoon season (July–September). The average annual rainfall of Jacobabad is 122.5 mm as per 1991-2020 period. The highest annual rainfall ever is 838.7 mm, recorded in 2022, and the lowest annual rainfall ever is 3.3 mm, recorded in 1922.

The city struggles to provide heat-mitigation measures. Many residents who are able to, migrate to higher-elevation Quetta during the summer school break.

Airport and airbase 
The Shahbaz Air Base (co-located with the commercial airport in Jacobabad) was one of three Pakistani air bases used by U.S. and allied forces to support the Operation Enduring Freedom campaign in Afghanistan and reportedly ongoing drone strikes in North Western Pakistan tribal regions.

See also
 Jacobabad Junction railway station
 Jacobabad Tehsil
 Jacobabad District

References

Jacobabad District
Populated places in Sindh